Linette Lopez is an American journalist who focuses on US politics and economics and writes columns for Business Insider. She also investigates companies involved with public-facing controversies such as Tesla, Inc.

Career
Lopez attended Columbia University for both undergraduate and graduate studies, where she concentrated in business and international journalism in addition to audio production. Lopez's career in news started in 2008 following her recruitment by Business Insider from Columbia University's School of Journalism following her graduation. At Insider, she aggressively covered entrepreneur Elon Musk's businesses, and, in 2018, Musk openly disputed Lopez's reporting by claiming that she had written "several false articles". He also claimed Lopez was on the payroll of short sellers betting against Tesla and, in the case of Martin Tripp's whistleblowing, paid bribes to Tripp to steal company secrets. Her coverage of Tesla specifically ended in 2021.

Later in 2022, Lopez's Twitter account was suspended following the December 15, 2022 Twitter suspensions of many journalists, without receiving an explanation as to why.

References

External links 
 

Living people
21st-century American journalists
American online journalists
American women journalists
Year of birth missing (living people)
21st-century American women writers
Columbia College (New York) alumni
Columbia University Graduate School of Journalism alumni